Hydrocotyle tambalomaensis is a species of flowering plant in the family Araliaceae. It is endemic to Ecuador. Its natural habitats are subtropical or tropical moist montane forests and subtropical or tropical high-altitude grassland.
It is threatened by habitat loss.

References

tambalomaensis
Endemic flora of Ecuador
Near threatened flora of South America
Taxonomy articles created by Polbot